Hans Röttiger (16 April 1896 – 15 April 1960) was a Panzer General in the German Army during the Second World War and the first Inspector of the Army of the Bundeswehr.

Biography
Röttiger joined the Prussian Army in 1914 and served from 1915 as a Leutnant in the 20th Artillery Regiment. After the First World War he served in the Reichswehr as a battery officer, adjutant, and battery chief. He then served as an officer on the General Staff of the Wehrmacht.
 
At the beginning of the Second World War Röttiger was an Oberstleutnant and he served from 1939–1940 as the Chief of Operations for VI Corps. From 1940–1942 he was Chief of Staff of XXXXI Corps and was then appointed the Chief of Staff of the 4th Panzer Army on the Eastern Front, serving at Stalingrad. From 1943 to 1944 he was Chief of Staff of the 4th Army and then of Army Group A from 1944–1945 under Generaloberst Josef Harpe. He then became the Chief of Staff of Army Group C in Italy under Generalfeldmarschall Albert Kesselring. On 30 January 1945 he was promoted to General der Panzertruppe.

Röttiger was a prisoner of war of the British and Americans from the end of the war until 1948. In 1950 he was a participant at the meeting to discuss the establishment of a new German defence force; the result of the meeting was the Himmerod memorandum.

Röttiger was accepted into the Bundeswehr in 1956 at the rank of Generalleutnant. On 21 September 1957 he became the first Inspector of the Army and was instrumental in its early development.

Röttiger was diagnosed with cancer in the late 1950s and spent his last years undergoing treatment. In the morning of 15 April 1960 he died in office, one day before his 64th birthday.

Awards
 German Cross in Gold on 26 January 1942 as Oberst im Genearalstab of the XXXXI Corps

Notes

References

External links
Biography on Deutsches Heer website

1896 births
1960 deaths
Military personnel from Hamburg
Generals of Panzer Troops
Bundeswehr generals
Recipients of the Gold German Cross
German Army personnel of World War I
Reichswehr personnel
Himmerod meeting participants
Lieutenant generals of the German Army